Władysław Ponurski (April 23, 1891 in Lemberg – October 13, 1978 in Kraków) was a Polish track and field athlete. Ponurski competed in the men's 200 metres and the men's 400 metres for Austria at the 1912 Summer Olympics. Ponurski was born in the Kingdom of Galicia and Lodomeria (now Ukraine).

References

External links
Olympic profile

1891 births
1978 deaths
Olympic athletes of Austria
Athletes (track and field) at the 1912 Summer Olympics
Austrian male sprinters
Polish male sprinters
Sportspeople from Lviv
Polish Austro-Hungarians
People from the Kingdom of Galicia and Lodomeria